Bolbitius titubans, also known as Bolbitius vitellinus, is a widespread species of mushroom found in America and Europe. It grows chiefly on dung or heavily fertilized soil, and sometimes on grass. It is nonpoisonous.

Description
The mushroom cap is between 1.5–7 cm, and grows from egg-shaped when young to broadly convex, finally ending up nearly flat. The cap's color starts yellow or bright yellow, and fades to whitish or greyish with age.  The gills are free from the stem or narrowly attached to it, are fragile and soft, and fade from whitish or pale yellowish to rusty cinnamon with age. The stem is 3–12 cm tall and 2–6 mm wide, is whitish-yellow with a fine mealy powdering, and is very delicate. The spores are brown, elliptical, and smooth.

The mushroom's edibility is unknown but it is too small to be worthwhile.

A similar species is Bolbitius aleuriatus.

References 

Bolbitiaceae